Mayday, known as Air Crash Investigation(s) outside of the United States and Canada and also known as Mayday: Air Disaster (The Weather Channel)  or Air Disasters  (Smithsonian Channel) in the United States, is a Canadian documentary television series produced by Cineflix that recounts air crashes, near-crashes, fires, hijackings, bombings, and other mainly flight-related disasters and crises. It reveals the events that led to each crisis or disaster, their causes as determined by the official investigating body or bodies, and the measures they recommended to prevent a similar incident from happening again. The programs use re-enactments, interviews, eyewitness testimony, computer-generated imagery, cockpit voice recordings, and official reports to reconstruct the sequences of events.

 This includes five Science of Disaster specials, each examining multiple crashes with similar causes. For broadcasters that do not use the series name Mayday, three Season 3 episodes were labelled as Crash Scene Investigation spin-offs, examining marine or rail disasters.

A sub-series labelled The Accident Files begain airing in 2018 and, as of 2023, has aired five seasons consisting of ten episodes per series. This sub-series consists entirely of summarised versions of air disasters previously investigated in the primary Mayday series, but combined based on similarities between the incidents, such as fires or pilot error. Each episode covers three accidents and 15 minutes is dedicated to each of the disasters that are covered.

Series overview

Episodes
Note: Episodes are ordered by their production number, not by their original air date.

Season 1 (2003)

Season 2 (2005)

Season 3 (2005)
Note: This is the first season produced in high definition.

Season 4 (2007)

Season 5 (2008)

Season 6 (2007–08) Special
Season 6 of Mayday is the first Science of Disaster season, consisting of three episodes. With the exception of BOAC Flight 781, all the incidents described in these episodes are summarised versions taken from their respective full episodes from the previous five seasons.

Season 7 (2009)

Season 8 (2009) Special
Season 8 of Mayday is the second Science of Disaster season, consisting of two episodes.

Season 9 (2010)

Season 10 (2011)

Season 11 (2011–12)

Season 12 (2012–13)

Season 13 (2013–14)

Season 14 (2015)

Season 15 (2016)

Season 16 (2016–17)

Season 17 (2017)

Season 18 (2018)

Season 19 (2019)

Season 20 (2020)

Season 21 (2021)

Season 22 (2022)

Season 23 (2023)

The Accident Files

Season 1 (2018)

Season 2 (2019)

Season 3 (2020)

Season 4 (2021)

Season 5 (2022)

Alternate titles
The following table lists the alternative titles used by broadcasters for Mayday, the original Canadian series; Air Crash Investigation, the British and Asia-Pacific (National Geographic Channel) versions; and Air Emergency and Air Disasters (Smithsonian Channel), the American versions of the series. The American column also shows the Smithsonian Channel's season and episode numbers. Episodes are ordered by their production number, and special episodes and spin-offs are italicised.

See also

 Blueprint for Disaster
 Seconds From Disaster
 Seismic Seconds
 Survival in the Sky, known as Black Box in the UK
 Why Planes Crash
 Zero Hour

Notes

References

External links
Cineflix: Mayday
Cineflix: Mayday – Science of Disaster (Archive)
Mayday on Discovery Channel Canada
Air Crash Investigation on National Geographic Channel UK
Air Crash Investigation on National Geographic Channel Australia
Air Disasters on Smithsonian Channel

Lists of Canadian television series episodes
Lists of non-fiction television series episodes